Lamm is a surname. Notable people with the surname include:

 Brad Lamm (born 1966), American interventionist, educator, and author
 Carolyn Lamm, American lawyer, president of the American Bar Association, 2009-10
 Claus Lamm (born 1973), Austrian psychologist
 Dottie Lamm (born 1937), American women's rights activist
 Emile Lamm (1834–1873), inventor and dentist
 Heinrich Lamm (1908–1974), German physician
 Henry Lamm (1846–1926), justice of the Supreme Court of Missouri
 Herman Lamm (1890–1930), German-American bank robber, also known as "Baron Lamm"
 Jan Peder Lamm (born 1935), Swedish archaeologist
 Karen Lamm (1952–2001), married to Dennis Wilson and Robert Lamm
 Kurt Lamm (1919–1987), German-born American soccer player, coach, manager, and administrator
 Lawrence Lamm (1896–1995), pioneer in the U.S. book packaging industry
 Lena L. Moore (née Lamm) (died 1969), American politician
 Nickolay Lamm, graphic artist and researcher
 Nomy Lamm (born 1975), American singer/songwriter
 Norman Lamm (1927-2020), American Orthodox Jewish communal leader
 Ole Lamm (1902–1964), Swedish physical chemist
 Peder Lamm (born 1970), Swedish antiques expert and television personality
 Peggy Lamm, American politician 
 Reto Lamm (born 1970), Swiss snowboarder
 Richard Lamm (1935–2021), American politician
 Robert Lamm (born 1944), American keyboardist, singer and songwriter
 Uno Lamm (1904–1989), Swedish electrical engineer
 Wendy Sue Lamm (born 1964), American photographer and photojournalist
 Yosef-Michael Lamm (1899–1976), Israeli judge and politician

See also 
 Casa Lamm, best known landmark in Colonia Roma
 Lamm equation, after Ole Lamm
 Lowe Alpine Mountain Marathon (LAMM), a two-day fell running and orienteering race held in the Scottish Highlands each June
 Lam (disambiguation)
 Lamb (disambiguation)
 Lamsdorf (disambiguation)